Angvik or Angvika is a small village in Gjemnes Municipality in Møre og Romsdal county, Norway.  The village is located along the western shores of the Tingvollfjorden, just across the fjord from the village of Tingvollvågen.

The population of Angvik is about 300. There is a furniture factory, a salmon fish farm, a Spa Hotel, and tourist apartments.

References

Villages in Møre og Romsdal
Gjemnes